The 1964 United States presidential election in New York took place on November 3, 1964, as part of the 1964 United States presidential election in which all 50 states plus the District of Columbia participated. New York voters chose 43 electors to represent them in the Electoral College via a popular vote pitting incumbent Democratic President Lyndon B. Johnson and his running mate, President pro tempore of the Senate Hubert Humphrey, against Republican challenger and Senator Barry Goldwater from Arizona and his running mate and Chair of the Republican National Committee, William E. Miller.

Johnson carried the state in a historic landslide, taking 68.56% of the vote to Goldwater's 31.31%, a victory margin of 37.25%. This is the only election in history in which a Democratic presidential candidate carried every single county in the state of New York. The staunch conservative Barry Goldwater was widely seen in the liberal New England states as a right-wing extremist; he had voted against the Civil Rights Act of 1964, and the Johnson campaign portrayed him as a warmonger who as president would provoke a nuclear war. Thus Goldwater performed especially weakly in northeastern states like New York: he wrote off the state and neighboring Connecticut, Massachusetts, Michigan, New Jersey, Pennsylvania, and Rhode Island from the beginning of his presidential campaign even before Kennedy's assassination. For the first time in history, a Democratic presidential candidate swept every Northeastern state in 1964. Not only did Johnson win every Northeastern state, but he won all of them with landslides of over 60% of the vote, including New York, which weighed in as the fifth most Democratic state in the nation.

Johnson dominated heavily Democratic cities such as New York City, the largest in the country, as well as Albany, Buffalo, Rochester, and Syracuse, which historically provided Democratic candidates an advantage, and all their counties went Democratic in 1964. However, Johnson also swept every county in the state, including traditionally Republican upstate New York and Long Island. Johnson carried all five boroughs of New York City, the first presidential candidate to do so since the landslide re-election of Franklin Roosevelt in 1936. In the borough of Manhattan, Johnson broke 80% of the vote, the first presidential candidate ever to do so. Brooklyn and the Bronx voted over 70% Democratic. Traditionally Republican Queens, narrowly carried by John F. Kennedy four years earlier in 1960, gave over 60% of the vote to Johnson. Even Staten Island voted Democratic, the only occasion it would do so between 1940 and 1992, although Goldwater's best performances at around 45% of the vote were in Staten Island along with Suffolk County, a historically Republican suburb of New York. Overall, New York City gave Johnson 73.02% of the vote, a citywide vote share no candidate would surpass until fellow Democrat Bill Clinton’s 77.10% in the 1996 election. With 2,183,646 votes from the five boroughs, Johnson also received more votes in New York City than any other presidential candidate in history, setting a record that would hold for over another half-century until Democrat Hillary Clinton would finally surpass him by winning the city by 2,191,869 votes in the 2016 election. Johnson's record of 4.9 million votes won by a single candidate in New York would hold for decades until surpassed by Democrat Joe Biden in the 2020 election.

Johnson's 68.56% of the vote remains the highest vote share any presidential candidate of either party has ever received in New York State. His 37.25% victory margin also remains the widest margin by which any Democratic presidential candidate has ever won New York State, and the second widest margin by which any candidate of either party has ever carried the state, only beaten narrowly by Republican Warren G. Harding’s 37.61% margin in the 1920 Republican landslide. This result made Johnson one of only three presidential candidates of either party who have been able to sweep every county in New York State, the others being Republicans Warren G. Harding in 1920 and Calvin Coolidge in 1924. New York weighed in for this election as 15% more Democratic than the national average.

This is the only time in American history that the counties of Genesee,  Livingston, Orleans, and Wyoming voted for the Democratic presidential nominee. It was also the first time in history that Chautauqua, Cortland, Essex, Ontario, Schuyler, and Washington counties voted Democratic, though all of these would vote again for any or all of Democrats Bill Clinton, Barack Obama, and Joe Biden. Most of these counties were in the far western reaches of New York where the Whig Party was strongest in the 2nd party system between 1828 and 1852, before the rise of the Republican Party and during which Democrats regularly won more than a handful of upstate New York counties. 

Many counties ended long streaks of not voting Democratic: It was the first time since 1948 that Monroe County voted for a Democrat, the first time since 1936 that Richmond, Rockland, Schenectady, and Sullivan counties voted for a Democrat, the first time since 1932 that Rensselaer County voted for a Democrat, the first time since 1916 that Chemung, Greene, Hamilton, Otsego, and Schoharie counties voted for a Democrat, the first time since 1912 that Cattaraugus, Columbia, Herkimer, Lewis, Nassau, Putnam, Seneca, Steuben, Suffolk, Tompkins, Ulster, and Westchester counties voted for a Democrat, the first time since 1876 that Orange County voted for a Democrat, the first since 1872 that Dutchess county voted for a Democrat, and the first time since 1852 that numerous upstate counties voted for a Democrat, namely: Allegany, Broome, Chenango, Delaware, Jefferson, Madison, Onondaga, Oswego, St. Lawrence, Tioga, Warren, and Wayne counties. Finally, Fulton and Cayuga counties had not voted Democratic since 1844, and Saratoga county not since 1836 — 128 years prior. 

Unlike some analogous Northeastern counties where Johnson only won very narrowly, like Lancaster in Pennsylvania, Johnson won these normally Republican upstate counties by large margins over 25%. Of these counties, Greene, Hamilton, Putnam, Steuben, Tioga, Allegany, and Wayne never voted Democratic since. Furthermore, Yates, Fulton, Chenango, Jefferson, Delaware, Herkimer, Lewis, Schoharie, Cattaraugus, Chemung, Oneida, Ontario, and Schuyler only voted Democratic once since, in all cases being Bill Clinton in 1996.

Results

Results by county

Counties that flipped from Republican to Democratic 

 Allegany 
 Broome 
 Cattaraugus 
 Cayuga 
 Chautauqua
 Chemung 
 Chenango
 Columbia
 Cortland
 Delaware
 Dutchess
 Essex
 Fulton
 Genesee
 Greene
 Hamilton
 Herkimer
 Jefferson
 Lewis
 Livingston
 Madison
 Monroe
 Nassau
 Onondaga 
 Ontario 
 Orange
 Orleans
 Oswego 
 Otsego 
 Putnam
 Rensselaer
 Richmond (coterminous with Staten Island, a borough of New York City)
 Rockland
 St. Lawrence
 Saratoga
 Schenectady
 Schoharie
 Schuyler
 Seneca
 Steuben
 Suffolk
 Sullivan
 Tioga
 Tompkins
 Ulster
 Warren
 Washington
 Wayne
 Westchester
 Wyoming
 Yates

See also
 United States presidential elections in New York
 Civil Rights Movement
 Great Society
 Jim Crow laws
 Presidency of Lyndon B. Johnson
 The Cold War
 Vietnam War

References

New York
1964
1964 New York (state) elections
Articles containing video clips